Capital punishment in Michigan was legal from the founding of Sault Ste Marie in 1668 during the French colonial period, until abolition by the state legislature in 1846 (except nominally for treason). Michigan is one of three U.S. states (along with Alaska and Hawaii) never to have executed anyone following admission into the Union. The federal government, however, outside Michigan's jurisdiction, carried out one federal execution at FCI Milan in 1938.

Michigan's death penalty history is unusual, as Michigan was the first Anglophone jurisdiction in the world to abolish the death penalty for ordinary crimes. The Michigan State Legislature voted to do so on May 18, 1846, and that has remained the law ever since. Although the death penalty was formally retained as a punishment for treason until 1963, no person was ever tried for treason against Michigan. Thus, Michigan has not executed any person since before statehood.

History 
All executions in areas which are now part of the State of Michigan were performed before the state was admitted to the Union, when Michigan became the 26th State on January 26, 1837.

About a dozen people are known to have been executed from 1683 to 1836. The area that is now Michigan was part of colonial New France from 1612 (first permanent settlement, Sault Sainte Marie, 1668) to 1763, when the Treaty of Paris (1763) transferred New France to Great Britain.  It was part of British Indian Territory, 1763 to 1774 when it became part of the Province of Quebec.  The Treaty of Paris (1783) legally transferred the area to the new United States of America but Lower Michigan remained under British control until 1796, and Upper Michigan until 1818 (transferred pursuant to the Treaty of Ghent of 1814). In this early period, there were a number of cases where persons who had committed a capital crime in Detroit were transported to Montreal for trial and execution.

The first person known to be executed in Michigan was an Aboriginal North American named Folle-Avoine. The first person executed under US Jurisdiction was a Native American named Buhnah. Two women were executed in Michigan, both during the British colonial period – an unnamed Native American slave (owned by a man named Clapham) in 1763, and a black slave named Ann Wyley in 1777. By race, seven of 15 were Native Americans; seven were European-Americans; and one was an African-American.

The 1830 hanging of a tavern keeper, Stephen Gifford Simmons, who had in a drunken fit killed his wife, generated more popular opposition to the death penalty than the prior hanging of Native Americans. Consequently, Simmons' was the last execution under Michigan law.

The death penalty has been unconstitutional in Michigan since the 1963 constitution took effect on 1 January 1964.

Federal death penalty 

Even though Michigan abolished the death penalty in 1846, the Federal death penalty can still be imposed. Thus, the United States was able to execute Tony Chebatoris at the Federal Detention Farm (now Federal Correctional Institution, Milan) near Milan, Michigan in 1938, for a murder he committed while robbing a federal bank in Midland, Michigan.

The 2002 conviction of Marvin Gabrion received national attention when he was sentenced to death for the murder of Rachel Timmerman in Newaygo County, Michigan. Gabrion is also suspected of four other killings but was never tried for them, including the murder of Rachel Timmerman's 11-month-old daughter Shannon Verhage.

U.S. Attorneys (i.e. federal prosecutors) in the latter case relied on the dual sovereignty doctrine to seek a death sentence because the murder took place on federal land. Gabrion was the first person in the United States to receive the federal death penalty for a crime committed in a non-death penalty state since the federal death penalty was reinstated in 1988. The sentence was overturned in 2013 by a panel of the Sixth Circuit, but was later reinstated 12–4 by the full court sitting en banc.

See also 

 List of people executed in Michigan
 Crime in Michigan
 Law of Michigan

Notes

References 
 
 
 

 
Michigan
Legal history of Michigan
Michigan law